The electoral district of Springvale was an electoral district of the Legislative Assembly in the Australian state of Victoria. 
It was replaced in 2002, by the electoral districts of Lyndhurst and Mulgrave.

Members for Springvale

Election results

See also
 Parliaments of the Australian states and territories
 List of members of the Victorian Legislative Assembly

References

Former electoral districts of Victoria (Australia)
1976 establishments in Australia
2002 disestablishments in Australia